"Yosemite" is a song by American rapper and singer Travis Scott. The song features appearances from fellow American rapper Gunna and Canadian rapper Nav. It was sent to rhythmic contemporary radio, as the third single from Scott's third studio album, Astroworld, on November 20, 2018. The artists wrote the song alongside producers, June James, Turbo, and Ramy.

Background and composition
The song's title refers to Yosemite National Park, a place that is located in the Sierra Nevada mountain range in the eastern area of California. Gunna delivers a "smooth" guitar-driven melody of the chorus that sets the tone of "Yosemite". Travis Scott in a way matches his cadence on the verse, echoing that of which Gunna used on his single "Sold Out Dates", featuring American rapper Lil Baby, which he released earlier in 2018. The two artists both calmly rap and sing about their hedonistic lifestyles with many pieces of jewelry. When "Yosemite" was originally released, Nav had an unusually quiet voice in the song, which went viral, resulting in memes regarding him to the extent in which the rapper poked light fun at himself. However, one week later, this was fixed. The song's production incorporates airy flutes and Western twangs.

Critical reception 
"Yosemite" received positive reviews from critics, with a majority of the praise going towards Gunna's appearance (the song's chorus) and the song's guitar sample that is evident in most of his songs. Despite mostly positive reviews, the original mix to Nav's vocals (the song's outro) was heavily criticized for being too quiet and poorly mixed.

Chart performance
"Yosemite" debuted and peaked at number 25 on the US Billboard Hot 100 chart, on the issue dated August 18, 2018. This became the fourth highest-charting song from the album. It managed to chart for 18 weeks in total on the Hot 100. The song marks Gunna's first entry on the chart, although featured artists are not credited on the album, since Scott does not regularly credit them on albums. On July 26, 2019, the song was certified double platinum by the Recording Industry Association of America (RIAA) for combined sales and streaming equivalent units of over two million units in the United States.

Music video
The official music video for the song, directed by Nabil Elderkin, was released on November 30, 2018. In the video, a young Scott is seen looking for Astroworld through a dense jungle. The kid's journey to find the theme park is a symbolic representation of the artist's rise to fame and the commercial success that came with creating, or "finding", his third studio album, Astroworld. Gunna also appears in the video with the adult Scott on a plane as they perform the song. However, Nav does not appear in the video.

Charts

Certifications

Release history

References

External links
 

2018 singles
2018 songs
Travis Scott songs
Songs written by Travis Scott
Gunna (rapper) songs
Songs written by Gunna (rapper)
Nav (rapper) songs
Songs written by Nav (rapper)
Songs written by Turbo (record producer)
Song recordings produced by Turbo (record producer)
Cactus Jack Records singles
Epic Records singles
Grand Hustle Records singles
Internet memes introduced in 2018
Trap music songs